Auratonota splendida is a species of moth of the family Tortricidae. It is found in Ecuador.

The wingspan is 23.5 mm. It is similar to Auratonota aenigmatica, but the forewings are broader with longer termen. The markings are also broader.

References

Moths described in 2000
Auratonota
Moths of South America